The  team relay luge at the 2020 Winter Youth  Olympics took place on 20 January at the St. Moritz-Celerina Olympic Bobrun.

Results
The event was started at 09:30.

References

Team relay